Rubratoxins are hepatotoxic mycotoxin produced by Penicillium rubrum and Penicillium purpurogenum. Rubratoxin A and rubratoxin B have been known since 1950s, while rubratoxin C was recently reported. Rubratoxins are also known as protein phosphatase 2A (PP2A) specific inhibitor. The PP2A inhibitory activity of rubratoxin A is about 100-fold higher than rubratoxin B  and rubratoxin A is now used as a chemical probe for PP2A research.

References 

Mycotoxins
Phosphatase inhibitors
Acid anhydrides